The gray ratsnake or gray rat snake (Pantherophis spiloides), also commonly known as the central ratsnake, chicken snake, midland ratsnake, or pilot black snake, is a species of nonvenomous snake in the genus Pantherophis in the subfamily Colubrinae. The gray ratsnake is one of about ten species within the American ratsnake genus Pantherophis.

Description
Unlike other Pantherophis, whose conspicuous juvenile pattern fades into adulthood, the gray ratsnake in the southern part of its range does not undergo drastic ontogenetic changes in color or markings. Instead, it retains the juvenile pattern of dark elongate dorsal blotches separated by four, or more, pale gray body scales, a light gray crown with dark striping that forms an anteriorly facing spearpoint, and a solid band which covers the eyes and extends rearward to the posterior upper labial scales. However, in the northern part of its range it is black in adulthood, like P. alleghaniensis and P. obsoletus. The venter is usually off-white or pale gray with darker irregular blotches, and a double row of black spots behind the divided anal plate of the vent. The dorsal scale rows around midbody are usually weakly keeled. Because the gray ratsnake shares its range with other members of its genus, hybrids of midlands x eastern ratsnakes are not uncommon.

Distribution and habitat
Native to North America, Pantherophis spiloides is commonly found in the forests of the eastern and central United States. It occurs relatively continuously throughout the major part of the eastern half of the United States, along the western edge of the Appalachian Mountains, from southwestern New England to the Gulf of Mexico, westward to the Mississippi River, and northward from northern Louisiana to southwestern Wisconsin.

In Canada, this species is known to occur in two disjunct regions of southern Ontario: the Carolinian forest region along the north shore of Lake Erie in the southwest, and the Great Lakes/St. Lawrence region in the southeast.

Habitat
An agile climber, the gray ratsnake is at home from the ground to the tree tops in many types of hardwood forest and cypress stands, along tree-lined streams and fields, and even around barns and sheds in close proximity to people. Within its range, almost any environment rich in rodents, and vertical escape options, proves a suitable habitat for the gray ratsnake.

Diet and behavior

Diet
A scent-hunter and a powerful constrictor, P. spiloides feeds primarily on small mammals, birds, and bird eggs. Neonates and juveniles prefer a diet of frogs and lizards.

Behavior
When startled, the gray ratsnake, like other ratsnakes, stops and remains motionless with its body held in a series of wave-like kinks. The snake will also rattle its tail against whatever it is lying on, making an audible buzzing sound. The gray ratsnake will defend itself by raising its head and bluffing a strike. If handled, it will musk a victim by releasing the foul-smelling contents of its cloaca, and will bite if necessary. However, the gray ratsnake is less likely to bite than other members of its genus, and wounds from a bite rarely require more than a small bandage.

Reproduction
Breeding in P. spiloides takes place from April to July. Females reach sexual maturity at 7–9 years of age. They deposit 5 to 27 eggs around mid-summer, and the  hatchlings usually emerge in September.

Conservation status
The gray ratsnake is considered common across much of its range, but is listed as "of special concern" in Michigan and is also listed as rare in Wisconsin. The gray ratsnake is listed federally in Canada as "endangered" (Carolinean population) and "threatened" (Great Lakes – St. Lawrence population). In the state of Georgia, all indigenous, nonvenomous snakes are illegal to kill or capture, and are considered to be in the custody of the Georgia Department of Natural Resources.

Habitat destruction and road mortality are leading causes of decline.

References

Further reading
Powell R, Conant R, Collins JT (2016). Peterson Field Guide to Reptiles and Amphibians of Eastern and Central North America, Fourth Edition. Boston and New York: Houghton Mifflin Harcourt. xiv + 494 pp. . (Pantherophis spiloides, pp. 389–390 + Figure 161 on p. 334 + Plate 36 on p. 335 + Map on p. 385 + Figure 180 on p. 386).

Rat snakes
Reptiles of Ontario
Reptiles of the United States
Reptiles described in 1854
Taxa named by André Marie Constant Duméril
Taxa named by Gabriel Bibron
Taxa named by Auguste Duméril
Colubrids